Dwarkadhish Ji is a Hindu Temple, situated on the southern bank of the Rajsamand lake in Kankroli. The temple commands a very fine view of the lake. This temple is temple is dedicated to Dwarkadhish Ji, one of the seven swaroops of Pushtimarg of Vallabhacharya.

History
Originally, Dwarkadhish Ji temple was in Gokul. During Mughal rule, temples were threatened with frequent invasions, vandalism and arson. Dwarkadhish ji, was also exposed to this danger. Apprehending danger to Dwarkadhish Ji, Goswami Girdharji took the deity with him to Ahmedabad. Due to apprehension there as well, he was invited to Mewar in 1671 AD.

Maharana Raj Singh granted village of Asotiya for Dwarkadhish Ji. Temple was constructed in Asotiya.  After  Rajsamand Lake was built, due to heavy rainfall, the Aasotia temple was flooded and the temple became islet. MaharajKumar AmarSingh allocated Darikhana and Haveli's high ground for construction of new temple of DwarkadhishJi.

Temple is built in haveli form and beauty of the temple tends to be enhanced because of the lush greenery of the surroundings. More and more additions were done to the temple complex over the time. The temple sits on the high bank of Rajsamand Lake. The shikhar is generally a noticeable characteristic decorated with various sculptures. The priest and attendants of the temples are Gosains, whose ancestors were Brijwasis. (inhabitants of Brij).

Darshan of the deity is available in following aartis:
Morning Mangla
Shringar
Gwal
Raj Bhog
Utthapan 
Bhog
Arti 
Sahyan.

People from every corner of the country come here for Darshan.

Festivals
Festivals are held in the tradition of Pushtimarg.

Janamashtami
Nanda Mahotsava
Deepawali
 Annkuta 
 Patotsava
Phag in Phalgun month
Holi
Dolotsava
Ramnavmi
Akshai Tritiya
Various Ratha Yatras

References

External Links
http://www.shrinathjihelpline.com/dwarkadhish-temple-rajsamand-nathdwara.html

Hindu temples in Rajasthan
Tourist attractions in Rajsamand district
Krishna
Mewar